Ward Mountain may refer:

In the United States:
 Ward Mountain (Alabama)
 Ward Mountain (Alaska)
 Ward Mountain (California)
 Ward Mountain (Georgia)
 Ward Mountain (Montana)
 Ward Mountain (Nevada)
 Ward Mountain (North Carolina)
 Ward Mountain (Tennessee)
 Ward Mountain (Texas)
 Ward Mountain (Massachusetts)
In Canada:
 Ward Mountain (Manitoba)